The 2013–14 Tennessee Tech Golden Eagles men's basketball team represented Tennessee Technological University during the 2013–14 NCAA Division I men's basketball season. The Golden Eagles, led by third year head coach Steve Payne, played their home games at the Eblen Center and were members of the East Division of the Ohio Valley Conference. They finished the season 17–16, 9–7 in OVC play to finish in fourth place in the East Division. They advanced to the quarterfinals of the OVC tournament where they lost to Morehead State.

Roster

Schedule

|-
!colspan=9 style="background:#7329B0; color:#F7D417;"| Regular season

|-
!colspan=9 style="background:#7329B0; color:#F7D417;"| 2014 Ohio Valley Conference tournament

References

Tennessee Tech Golden Eagles men's basketball seasons
Tennessee Tech